Carlos Tapia García (July 11, 1941 – January 19, 2021) was a Peruvian politician, researcher, analyst, editor, and engineer. He served in the Chamber of Deputies of Peru, the former lower house of Congress, from 1985 to 1990 as a member of the United Left alliance. He was later appointed a Commissioner on the Truth and Reconciliation Commission, which investigated human rights abuses committed by Shining Path and other groups during the Internal conflict in Peru in the 1980s and 1990s. Tapia served on the truth commission from 2001 to 2003.

References

1941 births
2021 deaths
Members of the Chamber of Deputies of Peru
People from Lima
Deaths from the COVID-19 pandemic in Peru